In  Hindu mythology, the God Ganesh has 108 names. The following is a list of the names.

List of names

See also
 Ganesh Chaturthi

References

External links 

Forms of Ganesha
Names of God in Hinduism